Katarina Hribar (born 28 October 1913, date of death unknown) was a Slovenian-Yugoslavian gymnast. She competed in the women's artistic team all-around event at the 1936 Summer Olympics.

References

External links
 

1913 births
Year of death missing
Slovenian female artistic gymnasts
Olympic gymnasts of Yugoslavia
Gymnasts at the 1936 Summer Olympics
Sportspeople from Ljubljana